The least big-eared bat (Neonycteris pusilla) is a bat species of the family Phyllostomidae, found in northwestern Brazil and eastern Colombia. It is the only species within its genus.

References

Bats of South America
Bats of Brazil
Mammals of Colombia
Phyllostomidae
Mammals described in 1949